Nicholas Harvey (by 1491 – 1532), of Ickworth, Suffolk, was an English Member of Parliament for Huntingdonshire in 1529.

References

15th-century births
1532 deaths
Politicians from Suffolk
English MPs 1529–1536